Assamese cinema, also known as Jollywood, is an Indian film industry of Assamese-language motion pictures. It is based in Assam, India. The industry was born in 1935 when Jyoti Prasad Agarwala released his movie Joymoti. Since then the Assamese cinema has developed a slow-paced, sensitive style, especially with the movies of Bhabendra Nath Saikia and Jahnu Barua. The industry is called Jollywood, named for Agarwala's Jyoti Chitraban Film Studio.

Despite its long history and its artistic successes, for a state that has always taken its cinema seriously, Assamese cinema has never really managed to break through on the national scene despite its film industry making a mark in the National Awards over the years. Although the beginning of the 21st century has seen Bollywood-style Assamese movies hitting the screen, the industry has not been able to compete in the market, significantly overshadowed by the larger industries such as Bollywood.

History

1930s

The origins of Assamese cinema can be traced back to Rupkonwar Jyotiprasad Agarwala, who was also a noted poet, playwright, composer and freedom fighter. He was instrumental in the production of the first Assamese Film Joymati in 1935, under the banner of Chitralekha Movietone. Due to the lack of trained technicians, Jyotiprasad, while making his maiden film, shouldered the added responsibilities as the scriptwriter, producer, director, choreographer, editor, set and costume designer, lyricist, and music director. The film, completed with a budget of 60,000 rupees was released on 10 March 1935. The picture failed. Like so many early Indian films, the negatives and complete prints of Joymati are missing.  Some effort has been made privately by Altaf Mazid to restore and subtitle whatever is left of the prints.
Despite the significant financial loss from Joymati, the second picture Indramalati was filmed between 1937 and 1938 finally released in 1939. Pramathesh Barua released his Assamese version of Devdas in 1937. It was the last of the 3 language version following Bengali and Hindi.

1940s

Agarwala made another film after a lapse of two years titled Indramalati. It was his second and last film. The eminent composer and singer of Assam Bhupen Hazarika, played a prominent role in the play. With the passing away of Jyotiprasad, the Assamese film scene witnessed a temporary lull for about a couple of years. But things changed with the onset of World War II, Taking advantage of this, Rohini Kr. Baruah made a film on a relevant historical topic called Manomati in 1941. It was followed by films like Parvati Prasad Baruwa's Rupahi (1946), Kamal Narayan Choudhury's Badan Barphukan (1947), Phani Sharma's Siraj, Asit Sen's Biplabi, Prabin Phukan's Parghat and Suresh Goswami's Runumi.

1950s

In the 1950s, Piyoli Phukan went on to win a National award. The movie was produced by Gama Prasad Agarwalla under the aegis of Rup Jyoti Productions. The film was directed by Phani Sharma and the music was composed by Bhupen Hazarika. The film was about the life of the freedom fighter Piyali Phukan, who stood against the British Rule. He was executed by the British on charges of treason. This film technically was advanced for that time. In 1955, a new talent Nip Barua made his directorial debut with Smrit Paras. His subsequent films Mak Aaru Moram and Ranga Police won many state awards and the silver medal at the national level. Bhupen Hazarika also produced and directed his first film Era Bator Sur. Prabhat Mukherjee made a film on the universality of motherhood, Puberun (1959), which was shown in the Berlin Film Festival.

1960s

The next notable film production was Lachit Borphukan by Sarbeswar Chakraborty. Bhupen Hazarika made his musical Shakuntala in 1961, which proved equally successful with critics and the press, winning the president's silver medal. Following this, a chain of films went into regular production and got released, including Nip Barua's Narakasur, Anil Choudhury's Matri Swarga, Brojen Barua's Itu Situ Bahuto and Mukta and Anwar Hussain's Tejimala.

By the middle of the sixties, film began to be produced in Assam on a regular basis. However, between 1935 and 1970 a total of 62 films were produced. Besides the film makers already referred to, many others engaged in film making during the period included Pravin Sharma, Saila Barua, Amar Pathak, Indukalpa Hazarika, Brajen Barua, Dibon Barua, Debkumar Basu, Amulya Manna, Gauri Barman, Atul Bardoloi, Sujit Singha, Nalin Duara and Prafulla Barua.

1970s

During the period of 1970-82 a total of 57 Assamese films were made. New directors started emerging. Samarendra Narayan Dev's Aranya (1970), Kamal Choudhury's Bhaity (1972, the first colour film of Assam), Manoranjan Sur's Uttaran (1973), Prabin Bora's Parinam (1974), Deuti Barua's Bristi (1974), Pulok Gogoi's Khoj (1974), Padum Barua's Gonga Silonir Pakhi (1976), Bhabendranath Saikia's Sandhya Raag (1977) and Atul Bordoloi's Kollol (1978) are films worth mentioning.

1980s

Notable directors of contemporary Assamese cinema are Jahnu Barua (who directed Aparoopa, Papori, Halodhia Choraye Baodhan Khai, Bonani, Firingoti and Xagoroloi Bohu Door); Sanjeev Hazarika (Haladhar, Meemanxa) and Bhabendra Nath Saikia who directed Sandhya Raag, Anirbaan, Agnisnaan, Sarothi, Kolahol, Abartan, Itihaas and Kaal Sandhya). Other directors include Santwana Bordoloi who directed Adajya, Bidyut Chakraborty who made Rag Birag, both of which have won national and international awards, and Manju Borah with her multiple award-winning films such as Baibhab, Akashitarar Kathare, and Laaz.

Halodhia Choraye Baodhan Khai became the first Assamese film to win the National Film Award for Best Feature Film in 1988 and also won multiple awards at the Locarno International Film Festival in 1988.

1990s

2000s

In the starting of the 2000s, the director-actor-musician trio of Munin Barua, Jatin Bora and Zubeen Garg made many popular hit films like Hiya Diya Niya and Nayak.

2010s

The 2010s saw the release of four Assamese blockbusters - Raamdhenu, Mission China, Kanchanjangha and Ratnakar each collecting over ₹2 crore in the box office. Tumi Aahibane and Priyaar Priyo  also crossed the one crore mark.

The 2010s also saw the rise of young independent voices in Assamese cinema, with unique films such as Local Kung Fu (Kenny Basumatary), Kothanodi and Aamis (Bhaskar Hazarika), Village Rockstars and Bulbul Can Sing (Rima Das) garnering accolades both nationally and internationally. Also was released the underground cult short film Muktir Mohakabyo.

The 2010s also saw the loss of many prominent personalities like director Munin Baruah, actor Biju Phukan, musician Bhupen Hazarika, who have played an important role in shaping Assamese cinema.

2018
In 2018, Village Rockstars won the Best Feature Film 'Swarna Kamal' award at the 65th National Film Awards in Delhi, hence becoming the second Assamese film after Halodhia Choraye Baodhan Khai to win this award. The film also won awards in the categories of Best Child Artist, Best Audiography and Best Editing. The film is also selected for India's official entry to 91st Academy Awards making it the first film from Assam to do this.

On 28 July 2018, another Assamese film Xhoixobote Dhemalite received three awards for Best Film, Best Actress and Best Music in 3rd Love International Film Festival in Los Angeles, US. The film also got 8 nominations. It also became the first Assamese film to release in the US.

2019
In 2019, two commercial hit movies were released. one is Kanchanjangha and another is Ratnakar.
 
Kanchanjangha, released on 5 September become the fastest Assamese film to cross the  ₹1 crore mark by doing so in 4 days. The film also crossed the ₹2 crore mark within 1 week after its release. It collected total 7 crore rupees.

Ratnakar, released on 11 October became a hit and earned ₹90.5 lakh in 2 days. After one week of release it earned ₹3.31 crore rupees which is the highest gross for any Assamese cinema in one week. After two weeks it earned total ₹6.63 crore rupees, breaking all box office records of Assamese cinema. After six weeks it collected a total  9.25 crore.
Ji Galpar Ses Nai was made in 2019 and yet to released, is the first anthology film directed by Prodyut Kumar Deka, Prashant Saikia and UtpalDatta.

Assamese films

All time highest grossing Assamese films 
Background color  indicates the now running on theatres. This list also include some old films with their box office collection inflation adjusted

Awards

Assam State Film Awards

Assam State Film Award is an award ceremony for Assamese Films in Guwahati.

Prag Cine Awards

Prag Cine Awards are presented annually by Prag News. The aim of the award is to give support, recognition and inspiration to the Assamese film industry and honour some of the eminent film personalities who have contributed to the cause of Assamese cinema. The award was first instituted in the year 2003. Starting from 2015, films produced in other Northeastern states were also honoured in this ceremony.

Brahmaputra Valley Film Festival

Brahmaputra Valley Film Festival is a homage to the rich culture of Northeast India. The festival is dedicated to the film fraternity of the Northeast region of India, especially Assam. It is an initiative for new filmmakers to come together and rediscover various aspects of film making. The film festival is in Guwahati, Assam, India annually since 2013. It is an initiative of Tattva Creations.

National Film Award

References

External links

 Assamese film at the Internet Movie Database
 Tracing the history of Assamese Cinema at Indian Auteur
 History of Assamese Cinema from rupaliparda.com

Cinema of Assam
Cinema by language of India